Kimon Friar (April 8, 1911 – May 25, 1993) was a Greek-American poet and translator of Greek poetry.

Youth and education
Friar was born in 1911 in İmralı, Ottoman Empire, to a Greek father and a Greek mother. In 1915, the family moved to the United States and Friar became an American citizen in 1920. As a child, Friar had problems with the English language, and so he spent his time on artistic efforts. At a young age, despite his trouble with English, Friar discovered poetry and later he became interested in drama. After reading Ode on a Grecian Urn by John Keats, Friar became fascinated with the energy of the English language and he determined to master it.

Friar was educated at a number of institutions, including the Chicago Art Institute, the Yale School of Drama, the University of Iowa, and University of Wisconsin–Madison where he received his bachelor's degree with honors in 1935. He went on to University of Michigan for his master's degree in 1940, and he won the Avery Hopwood Major Award for Yeats: A Vision.

Poetry and teaching
Although he was dedicated to writing and translating poetry, Friar began teaching to support himself soon after leaving the University of Michigan. He taught English at Adelphi from 1940–1945, at Amherst College from 1945–1946, at New York University from 1952–1953, and at University of Minnesota Duluth from 1953-1954. He also served as a visiting lecturer at UC Berkeley, the University of Illinois, Indiana University, and the Ohio State University.

During these years, Friar organized poetry readings for the pleasure of the public. He was the director of the Poetry Center in the YW/YMHA in New York City from 1943-1946 where he encouraged famous poets and amateurs to read their poetry at receptions. From 1951-1952, Friar ran the Theatre Circle at the Circle in the Square Theatre, also in New York City. The plays produced there were primarily from the works of Arthur Miller, Tennessee Williams, Lillian Hellman, and Archibald MacLeish.

During his time at Amherst, Friar became the teacher and first lover of American poet James Merrill. According to Merrill scholar Langdon Hammer, Friar's "influence would go on unfolding for the rest of Merrill's poetic career."

Editor and translator

Friar acted as the editor, from 1960–1962, of The Charioteer, and from 1963–1965, of Greek Heritage, two magazines dealing with Greek culture. Friar had been translating poetry from Greek into English, speaking both languages fluently and gaining a perspective on modern Greek poetry. He wrote, translated, and edited innumerable works, including Modern Poetry: American and British (with John Malcolm Brinnin) in 1951, the 1960 translation of Saviors of God and the 1963 translation of Sodom and Gomorrah by Nikos Kazantzakis, and the 1973 anthology Modern Greek Poetry: from Cavafis to Elytis. However, Friar is best known for his translation of Kazantzakis' epic poem The Odyssey: A Modern Sequel. Friar completed this work in 1958 after several years of close collaboration with the author. Some critics declared that Friar lost his way in the double adjectives and complex language of the original (Kazantzakis used ancient vocabulary that is generally unknown to metropolitan scholars), and others agreed that Friar was at his best when he chose the prosaic word over the contrived or archaic. A Time magazine reviewer regarded The Odyssey as "a masterpiece. Kimon Friar received from Kazantzakis the ultimate praise: that his translation was as good as the original."

Death and honors
In 1978, Friar received the Greek World Award. Then, in 1986, he won both a Ford Foundation grant and a National Foundation of the Arts and Humanities grant. He is quoted as saying: "I like to say that the poet in a translation should be heard, but the translator should be overheard."

He spent his last years in Greece and died on May 25, 1993.

Bibliography
Yeats: A Vision (1940)
Modern Poetry: American and British (with John Malcolm Brinnin) (1951)
The Odyssey: A Modern Sequel, translation in verses by Kimon Friar, New York: Simon and Schuster, 1958; London: Secker and Warburg, 1958.Saviors of God (1960)Sodom and Gomorrah by Nikos Kazantzakis (translation by Kimon Friar) (1963)Modern European Poetry, Bantam Classics, 1966, editor and translator of the Greek sectionWith Face to the Wall Selected Poems by Miltos Sahtouris, translations by Kimon Friar, Washington: The Charioteer Press, 1968.Modern Greek Poetry: from Cavafis to Elytis (1973)The Sovereign Sun: Selected poems by Odysseus Elytis, Trans. Kimon Friar (Philadelphia, United States 1974)

Literary Awards
Avery Hopwood Major Award
Ford Foundation Grant
National Foundation of the Arts Grant

References

External links 
Kimon Friar papers at Princeton University Library Special Collections
John Malcolm Brinnin-Kimon Friar correspondence and Brinnin literary manuscripts held by Special Collections, University of Delaware Library

1911 births
1993 deaths
Greek–English translators
American literary critics
American people of Greek descent
Anatolian Greeks
Emigrants from the Ottoman Empire to the United States
School of the Art Institute of Chicago alumni
Yale School of Drama alumni
University of Iowa alumni
University of Wisconsin–Madison alumni
University of Michigan alumni
Adelphi University faculty
Amherst College faculty
New York University faculty
University of California, Berkeley faculty
University of Minnesota faculty
University of Illinois faculty
Indiana University faculty
Ohio State University faculty
20th-century translators
20th-century American non-fiction writers